The Day Hell Broke Loose 2 - AKA Major Without A Major Deal is a hip-hop album from Swisha House.

Track listing 
Disc 1
 Intro - Swishahouse All-Stars
 Cash That I Got - Mike Jones, Lil' Keke, Slim Thug
 Still Tippin - Mike Jones, Slim Thug, Paul Wall
 Got It Sowed Up - Mike Jones
 I'm a Pimp - Mike Jones, Lil' Keke, Paul Wall
 Throwed - 5th Ward Weebie, Choppa, Mike Jones
 Hustlin - Mike Jones, Kyleon, Lil' Keke
 Gone Head - Chelcie Guidry, Mike Jones, Cydnee Williams
 Step Ya Game Up - Mike Jones, Paul Wall
 Magno & Killa - Kyleon, Magnificent
 Skit - Swishahouse All-Stars
 Lying - Honey, Mike Jones
 Rulez - Mike Jones, Mz. Trinity, Paul Wall
 I'm a Balla - Danno, Mel, Towdown
 Freestyle - Mike Jones, Magnificent, Tum Tum, Paul Wall

Disc 2
 Intro [Michael Watts] Chopped Up Remix] - Swishahouse All-Stars
 I'm a Pimp [Michael Watts Chopped Up Remix] - Mike Jones, Lil' Keke, Paul Wall
 Rulez [Michael Watts Chopped Up Remix] - Mike Jones, Mz. Trinity, Paul Wall
 Hustlin [Michael Watts Chopped Up Remix] - Mike Jones, Kyleon, Lil' Keke
 Gone Head [Michael Watts Chopped Up Remix] - Chelcie Guidry, Mike Jones, Cydnee Williams
 Mag & Killa [Michael Watts Chopped Up Remix] - Kyleon, Magnificent
 Step Ya Game Up [Michael Watts Chopped Up Remix] - Mike Jones, Paul Wall
 Skit [Michael Watts Chopped Up Remix] - Swishahouse All-Stars
 Lyin [Michael Watts Chopped Up Remix] - Honey, Mike Jones
 Cash That I Got [Michael Watts Chopped Up Remix] - Mike Jones, Lil' Keke, Slim Thug
 I'm a Balla [Michael Watts Chopped Up Remix] - Danno, Mel, Towdown
 Freestyle [Michael Watts Chopped Up Remix] - Mike Jones, Magnificent, Tum Tum, Paul Wall
 Got It Sowed Up [Michael Watts Chopped Up Remix] - Mike Jones
 Still Tippin [Michael Watts Chopped Up Remix] - Mike Jones, Slim Thug, Paul Wall
 Skit [Michael Watts Chopped Up Remix] - Swishahouse All-Stars
 Throwed [Michael Watts Chopped Up Remix] - 5th Ward Weebie, Choppa, Mike Jones

External links
 Official Swisha House Website

2003 albums